Taylor's blind skink (Dibamus taylori), also known commonly as the Lesser Sunda blind lizard, is a species of legless lizard in the family Dibamidae. The species is endemic to the Lesser Sunda Islands.

Etymology
The specific name, taylori, is in honor of American herpetologist Edward Harrison Taylor.

Reproduction
D. taylori is oviparous.

References

Further reading
Greer AE (1985). "The Relationships of the Lizard Genera Anelytropsis and Dibamus ". Journal of Herpetology 19 (1): 116–156. (Dibamus taylori, new species, p. 151).

Dibamus
Reptiles of Indonesia
Reptiles described in 1985